The Frank Anthony Public School (or FAPS) is a co-educational day-school, for students of age 4–18 years, in Bangalore, India. It was founded in 1967 by the Anglo-Indian educationist and barrister-at-law, Frank Anthony, who was also the Founder-Chairman of the All India Anglo-Indian Educational Trust which, today, owns and administers five schools named after him, including The Frank Anthony Public School, New Delhi, The Frank Anthony Public School, Bengaluru, The Frank Anthony Public School, Kolkata and three Frank Anthony Junior Schools in the cities of Bangalore, Kolkata and Delhi.

Overview
The school officially opened on 9 January 1967, being the third of the three Frank Anthony Public Schools in India. It is established, owned and administered by the All-India Anglo-Indian Education Institution, New Delhi, registered under the Societies Registration Act XXI of 1860. It is affiliated to the Council for the Indian School Certificate Examinations .

The school is divided into the Nursery Section, the Junior Section and the Senior Section. Each class has three sections in the Junior section, and five in the senior section. Before 2017, there were four in the senior section. Students of classes 11 and 12 are divided into three sections: 
 Science (English, Physics, Chemistry, Mathematics/Psychology, Biology/Computer Applications), 
 Commerce (English, Commerce, Accounts, Economics, Sociology/Second Language)
 Humanities (English, Literature in English, second language, History, Sociology, Political Science). 
The student count from Nursery to the Class XII is above 2000.

Terms
There are two academic terms in the year:
 First Term (late May to late September/early October)
 Second Term (early October to early April)

The second term is split into half by two and a half weeks of Christmas vacation. Summer vacation lasts from early April till late May, during the warmest part of the year in Southern India. There is a week off for Dasara, around late September or early October.

Houses
The House system is a feature common to Public Schools in India (based on an equivalent system in England).
FAPS has four houses, named after eminent members of the Anglo-Indians and benefactors of the school. Each house is represented by a colour and a motto that defines the House's identity.

House structure

Each house is led by two House Captains (a boy and a girl), two Vice-Captains (a boy and a girl), and a body of prefects, selected from among the students of Class XII.

Corbett House
 Colour : Blue
 Motto: "Deeds not Words"

D'mello House
 Colour : Yellow
 Motto : "To Greater Heights"

Gidney House
 Colour : Green
 Motto : "The Impossible is Possible"

Rodrigues House
 Colour : Red
 Motto : "Strive and Attain"

The houses compete in inter-house activities, including sports (such as cricket, basketball, football, volleyball, and throwball), athletics, quizzes, debates, and elocution competitions.

School song
May all we learn here in our school
By thought and deed be shown.
Let living truth within us rule,
And seeds of love be sown;
That men in all our deeds may see,
Courage is destiny!
Courage is Destiny!
We pray for grace, serenity
To keep a humble mind,
That we may learn through charity
To love all human kind;
That men in all our deeds may see
Courage is destiny!
Courage is destiny!
Undaunted, though alone we stand,
Upholding what is right.
Proud children of our mother land
With truth our stay and might;
That men in all our deeds may see
Courage is destiny!
Courage is destiny!
All that is good may we retain
When scattered far and wide.
May we our destiny attain
With courage as our guide;
To show that by our constancy
Courage is destiny!
Courage is destiny!

Facilities
The school has a playground where sports like cricket, football, hockey, and other field sports are played. Basketball, throwball, and volleyball courts are available. In academics, there are labs for physics, chemistry, biology, computer science, and home science.

In 2017, a multipurpose hall was constructed.

Tournaments
An inter-school girls throwball tournament is held every year in the month of August.

Tri-Faps
Every year an inter-school tournament, Tri-Faps is conducted in the one of the three Frank Anthony Public Schools across the country. The last Tri-Faps conducted at Delhi was in 2019, with recurrences every year, in one of the three Frank Anthony Public School campuses.

Heads

Principals
 C.W. Eastwood
 T.E. Allan
 E. McGready
 G.W. Mayer
 A.J. Wood
 V.E. Simcock
 Christopher Anthony Browne
 Keith Vivian Boye
 Kevin Dominic Pope (current)

Headmasters/Vice-Principals
The headmaster was in charge of the Senior section which includes classes 6 to 10 and the ISC grades. The office of Headmaster was renamed Vice-Principal in 2015.
 Keith Vivian Boye
 O.E. Fernandez
 Christopher Anthony Browne
 Kevin Dominic Pope
 Edwin Flynn

Headmistresses
The headmistress is in charge of the Junior section which includes the Nursery, Preparatory and classes 1 to 8.
 Lynn Cabral
 Lorraine Briggs 
 Catrina Hastings (current)

Notable alumni

 Pankaj Arjan Advani, snooker Champion
Divya Gokulnath, educator and co-founder of Byju's
 Lara Dutta, actress and Miss Universe 2000
 Major Sandeep Unnikrishnan, AC, National Security Guard
 Aditi Ashok, Professional Golfer
 Danish Sait, actor
 Stuart Binny, cricketer, India/Karnataka/Royal Challengers Bangalore (Indian Premier League)
 Arun Shenoy, musician, 2013 Grammy Award nominee
 Karun Nair, cricketer, India/Karnataka/Delhi Daredevils (Indian Premier League)
 Shreyas Gopal, cricketer, Karnataka/Mumbai Indians (Indian Premier League)
 Anaitha Nair, actress, Singer
 Abbas, actor
 Noyonita Lodh, model and Miss Diva Universe 2014.
 Gautam Sharma, TV actor and Model
 Siddharth Katragadda, artist, filmmaker, writer, engineer
 Barrington Rowland, cricketer, Karnataka
 Kanan Gill, stand-up comedian, actor and YouTuber

See also
 The Frank Anthony Public School, New Delhi
 The Frank Anthony Public School, Kolkata

References

External links
The Frank Anthony Public School, Bengaluru

Private schools in Bangalore
Educational institutions established in 1967
1967 establishments in Mysore State